Ottrau is a municipality in the Schwalm-Eder-Kreis in Hesse, Germany.

Geography
Ottrau lies about 10 km northeast of Alsfeld.

Constituent communities
The community of Ottrau is made up of six constituent communities:
 Ottrau:           730 inhabitants
 Immichenhain:     605 inhabitants
 Weißenborn:       377 inhabitants
 Görzhain:         374 inhabitants
 Schorbach:        348 inhabitants
 Kleinropperhausen: 64 inhabitants

History
The constituent community of Weißenborn had its first documentary mention in 1307 under the name Wisenburn. It was later also named Wiesenbrunn and the name that it has today comes from that.

Amalgamations
The Greater Community of Ottrau has consisted since Hesse's municipal reform in 1972 of the six formerly independent communities of Ottrau, Immichenhain, Weißenborn, Görzhain, Schorbach und Kleinropperhausen.

Politics

Municipal council

Ottrau's municipal council is made up of 15 councillors.
CDU 6 seats
SPD 4 seats
FWG (citizens' coalition) 3 seats
UWG (citizens' coalition) 2 seats
(As of municipal elections held on 26 March 2006)

Town partnership
  Drávafok, Hungary

Personalities

Honorary citizen
Dr. Wilhelm Schäfer, poet and writer, became an honorary citizen on the occasion of his 70th birthday in 1938. Ottrau's primary school is also named after him.

References

External links
  

Schwalm-Eder-Kreis